is a Japanese professional footballer who plays as a forward for  club Yokohama FC and has represented the Japan national football team.

Club career
Koki Ogawa joined J1 League club Júbilo Iwata in 2016. On April 6, he debuted in J.League Cup (v Ventforet Kofu).

Ogawa joined J2 League club, Mito HollyHock in 2019 on loan from Jubilo Iwata.

In 2022, Ogawa joined J2 club, Yokohama FC. On 23 October at same year, Ogawa brought his club promotion to J1 League for upcoming 2023 season as well as J2 Top Scorer 26 goals.

International career
In May 2017, Ogawa was elected Japan U-20 national team for 2017 U-20 World Cup. At this tournament, he played first two matches. He scored a goal against South Africa in first match. However, because he was injured in second match against Uruguay, he could not play in later matches.

In December 2019, Koki Ogawa was named in the senior squad to represent Japan in the East Asia Cup finals. Ogawa scored his first hat-trick against Hong Kong in his senior debut.

Career statistics

Club

International

International goals
Scores and results list Japan's goal tally first.

Honours

International
Japan U-19
AFC U-19 Championship: 2016

Individual
EAFF Championship Most Valuable Player: 2019
J2 League MVP: 2022
J2 League top scorer: 2022
J2 League Best XI: 2022

References

External links

Profile at Jubilo Iwata

1997 births
Living people
Association football people from Kanagawa Prefecture
Japanese footballers
Japan youth international footballers
J1 League players
J2 League players
J2 League Player of the Year winners
Júbilo Iwata players
Mito HollyHock players
Yokohama FC players
Association football forwards
Japan international footballers